The 2016–17 Portland Trail Blazers season was the franchise's 47th season in the National Basketball Association (NBA).

The Blazers would finish the regular season with a 41–41 record, securing the 8th seed. In the playoffs, they faced against the 1st seeded and eventual NBA champion Golden State Warriors in the First Round, in which they were swept in four games.

Draft picks

The Trail Blazers received the 47th pick of the 2016 NBA draft from the Orlando Magic in exchange for $1.2 million and a 2019 second-round pick. The Trail Blazers used this pick to draft Jake Layman out of Maryland.

Roster

Standings

Division

Conference

Game log

Preseason

|- style="background:#bfb;"
| 1
| October 3
| Jazz
| 
| Damian Lillard (16)
| Ed Davis (7)
| Lillard, McCollum (5)
| Moda Center15,004
| 1–0
|- style="background:#bfb;"
| 2
| October 7
| Suns
| 
| Shabazz Napier (20)
| Noah Vonleh (14)
| Mason Plumlee (6)
| Moda Center19,441
| 2–0
|- style="background:#bfb;"
| 3
| October 11
| @ Lakers
| 
| Damian Lillard (30)
| Mason Plumlee (11)
| CJ McCollum (6)
| Staples Center15,290
| 3–0
|- style="background:#fbb;"
| 4
| October 13
| @ Clippers
| 
| CJ McCollum (20)
| Ed Davis (11)
| Damian Lillard (9)
| Staples Center14,896
| 3–1
|- style="background:#fbb;"
| 5
| October 16
| Nuggets
| 
| CJ McCollum (20)
| Noah Vonleh (10)
| McCollum, Plumlee (4)
| Moda Center18,135
| 3–2
|- style="background:#bfb;"
| 6
| October 19
| @ Jazz
| 
| Damian Lillard (27)
| Mason Plumlee (10)
| Mason Plumlee (7)
| Vivint Smart Home Arena17,519
| 4–2
|- style="background:#fbb;"
| 7
| October 21
| @ Warriors
| 
| Damian Lillard (20)
| Noah Vonleh (9)
| McCollum, Lillard (4)
| Oracle Arena19,596
| 4–3

Regular season

|- style="background:#cfc;"
| 1
| October 25
| Utah
| 
| Damian Lillard (39)
| Damian Lillard (8)
| Damian Lillard (6)
| Moda Center 19,446
| 1–0
|- style="background:#fcc;"
| 2
| October 27
| L.A. Clippers
| 
| Damian Lillard (29)
| Damian Lillard (10)
| Plumlee, Crabbe (4)
| Moda Center19,500
| 1–1
|- style="background:#cfc;"
| 3
| October 29
| @ Denver
| 
| Damian Lillard (37)
| Al-Farouq Aminu (12)
| Damian Lillard (7)
| Pepsi Center18,055
| 2–1

|- style="background:#fcc;"
| 4
| November 1
| Golden State
| 
| Damian Lillard (31)
| Al-Farouq Aminu (10)
| Mason Plumlee (6)
| Moda Center19,393
| 2–2
|- style="background:#fcc;"
| 5
| November 2
| @ Phoenix
| 
| Damian Lillard (27)
| Mason Plumlee (12)
| Damian Lillard (5)
| Talking Stick Resort Arena17,284
| 2–3
|- style="background:#cfc;"
| 6
| November 4
| @ Dallas
| 
| Damian Lillard (42)
| Al-Farouq Aminu (10)
| Lillard, Plumlee (4)
| American Airlines Center19,475
| 3–3
|- style="background:#cfc;"
| 7
| November 6
| @ Memphis
| 
| CJ McCollum (37)
| Harkless, Plumlee (7)
| Damian Lillard (7)
| FedExForum16,233
| 4–3
|- style="background:#cfc;"
| 8
| November 8
| Phoenix
| 
| Damian Lillard (38)
| Noah Vonleh (8)
| CJ McCollum (7)
| Moda Center19,239
| 5–3
|- style="background:#fcc;"
| 9
| November 9
| @ L.A. Clippers
| 
| Shabazz Napier (11)
| Noah Vonleh (11)
| Mason Plumlee (4)
| Staples Center19,060
| 5–4
|- style="background:#cfc;"
| 10
| November 11
| Sacramento
| 
| Damian Lillard (36)
| Maurice Harkless (8)
| Lillard, Plumlee (7)
| Moda Center19,918
| 6–4
|- style="background:#cfc;"
| 11
| November 13
| Denver
| 
| Damian Lillard (32)
| Mason Plumlee (9)
| Damian Lillard (6)
| Moda Center19,362
| 7–4
|- style="background:#fcc;"
| 12
| November 15
| Chicago
| 
| Damian Lillard (19)
| Ed Davis (9)
| Lillard, Plumlee, McCollum (4)
| Moda Center13,393
| 7–5
|- style="background:#fcc;"
| 13
| November 17
| @ Houston
| 
| CJ McCollum (26)
| Mason Plumlee (8)
| Mason Plumlee (7)
| Toyota Center15,550
| 7–6
|- style="background:#fcc;"
| 14
| November 18
| @ New Orleans
| 
| Damian Lillard (27)
| Mason Plumlee (12)
| CJ McCollum (5)
| Smoothie King Center15,552
| 7–7
|- style="background:#cfc;"
| 15
| November 20
| @ Brooklyn
| 
| CJ McCollum (33)
| Mason Plumlee (8)
| McCollum, Lillard (5)
| Barclays Center16,608
| 8–7
|- style="background:#fcc;"
| 16
| November 22
| @ New York
| 
| Damian Lillard (22)
| Ed Davis (10)
| Damian Lillard (6)
| Madison Square Garden19,120
| 8–8
|- style="background:#fcc;"
| 17
| November 23
| @ Cleveland
| 
| Damian Lillard (40)
| Lillard, Harkless (7)
| Damian Lillard (11)
| Quicken Loans Arena20,562
| 8–9
|- style="background:#cfc;"
| 18
| November 25
| New Orleans
| 
| Damian Lillard (27)
| Mason Plumlee (14)
| Damian Lillard (11)
| Moda Center19,393
| 9–9
|- style="background:#fcc;"
| 19
| November 27
| Houston
| 
| CJ McCollum (28)
| Mason Plumlee (8)
| McCollum, Plumlee (7)
| Moda Center19,393
| 9–10
|- style="background:#cfc;"
| 20
| November 30
| Indiana
| 
| Damian Lillard (28)
| Plumlee, Davis (9)
| Damian Lillard (10)
| Moda Center19,107
| 10–10

|- style="background:#cfc;"
| 21
| December 3
| Miami
| 
| Damian Lillard (19)
| Mason Plumlee (9)
| Damian Lillard, Turner (6)
| Moda Center19,393
| 11–10
|- style="background:#cfc;"
| 22
| December 5
| @ Chicago
| 
| Damian Lillard (30)
| Maurice Harkless (8)
| Damian Lillard (7)
| United Center21,351
| 12–10
|- style="background:#fcc;"
| 23
| December 7
| @ Milwaukee
| 
| Damian Lillard (30)
| Mason Plumlee (10)
| Damian Lillard (6)
| BMO Harris Bradley Center14,033
| 12–11
|- style="background:#fcc;"
| 24
| December 8
| @ Memphis
| 
| Damian Lillard (24)
| Al-Farouq Aminu (11)
| Mason Plumlee (4)
| FedExForum14,317
| 12–12
|- style="background:#fcc;"
| 25
| December 10
| @ Indiana
| 
| CJ McCollum (34)
| Ed Davis (10)
| Damian Lillard (9)
| Bankers Life Fieldhouse16,211
| 12–13
|- style="background:#fcc;"
| 26
| December 12
| @ L.A. Clippers
| 
| CJ McCollum (25)
| Mason Plumlee (7)
| Damian Lillard (8)
| Staples Center19,060
| 12–14
|- style="background:#cfc;"
| 27
| December 13
| Oklahoma City
| 
| Mason Plumlee (18)
| Mason Plumlee (7)
| Damian Lillard (9)
| Moda Center19,505
| 13–14
|- style="background:#fcc;"
| 28
| December 15
| @ Denver
| 
| Damian Lillard (40)
| Plumlee, Vonleh (7)
| Damian Lillard (10)
| Pepsi Center10,022
| 13–15
|- style="background:#fcc;"
| 29
| December 17
| @ Golden State
| 
| Damian Lillard (20)
| Noah Vonleh (8)
| Mason Plumlee (5)
| Oracle Arena19,596
| 13–16
|- style="background:#fcc;"
| 30
| December 20
| @ Sacramento
| 
| CJ McCollum (36)
| Mason Plumlee (13)
| Damian Lillard (15)
| Golden 1 Center17,608
| 13–17
|- style="background:#fcc;"
| 31
| December 21
| Dallas
| 
| Damian Lillard (29)
| Ed Davis (10)
| Plumlee, Lillard (4)
| Moda Center19,393
| 13–18
|- style="background:#fcc;"
| 32
| December 23
| San Antonio
| 
| McCollum, Lillard, Leonard (16)
| CJ McCollum (6)
| Damian Lillard (10)
| Moda Center19,393
| 13–19
|- style="background:#fcc;"
| 33
| December 26
| Toronto
| 
| CJ McCollum (29)
| Mason Plumlee (15)
| CJ McCollum (7)
| Moda Center19,393
| 13–20
|- style="background:#cfc;"
| 34
| December 28
| Sacramento
| 
| CJ McCollum (20)
| Mason Plumlee (14)
| CJ McCollum (7)
| Moda Center19,665
| 14–20
|- style="background:#fcc;"
| 35
| December 30
| @ San Antonio
| 
| CJ McCollum (29)
| Al-Farouq Aminu (6)
| Mason Plumlee (6)
| AT&T Center18,418
| 14–21

|- style="background:#cfc;"
| 36
| January 1
| @ Minnesota
| 
| CJ McCollum (43)
| Plumlee, Crabbe (8)
| Plumlee, McCollum, Aminu (3)
| Target Center15,804
| 15–21
|- style="background:#fcc;"
| 37
| January 4
| @ Golden State
| 
| CJ McCollum (35)
| Mason Plumlee (10)
| McCollum, Crabbe (5)
| Oracle Arena19,596
| 15–22
|- style="background:#cfc;"
| 38
| January 5
| L. A. Lakers
| 
| CJ McCollum (27)
| Al-Farouq Aminu (11)
| Damian Lillard (10)
| Moda Center19,403
| 16–22
|- style="background:#fcc;"
| 39
| January 8
| Detroit
| 
| CJ McCollum (35)
| Mason Plumlee (10)
| Mason Plumlee (12)
| Moda Center13,506
| 16–23
|- style="background:#cfc;"
| 40
| January 10
| @ L.A. Lakers
| 
| CJ McCollum (25)
| Mason Plumlee (12)
| Damian Lillard (6)
| Staples Center18,997
| 17–23
|- style="background:#cfc;"
| 41
| January 11
| Cleveland
| 
| CJ McCollum (27)
| Al-Farouq Aminu (12)
| Evan Turner (11)
| Moda Center19,393
| 18–23
|- style="background:#fcc;"
| 42
| January 13
| Orlando
| 
| Damian Lillard (34)
| Plumlee, Aminu (7)
| Mason Plumlee (5)
| Moda Center19,344
| 18–24
|- style="background:#fcc;"
| 43
| January 16
| @ Washington
| 
| Damian Lillard (22)
| Noah Vonleh (8)
| Allen Crabbe (5)
| Verizon Center17,395
| 18–25
|- style="background:#fcc;"
| 44
| January 18
| @ Charlotte
| 
| Damian Lillard (21)
| Mason Plumlee (10)
| Damian Lillard (6)
| Spectrum Center15,451
| 18–26
|- style="background:#fcc;"
| 45
| January 20
| @ Philadelphia
| 
| Damian Lillard (30)
| Mason Plumlee (11)
| CJ McCollum (4)
| Wells Fargo Center19,476
| 18–27
|- style="background:#cfc;"
| 46
| January 21
| @ Boston
| 
| Damian Lillard (35)
| Mason Plumlee (11)
| CJ McCollum (7)
| TD Garden18,624
| 19–27
|- style="background:#cfc;"
| 47
| January 25
| L.A. Lakers
| 
| McCollum, Lillard (24)
| Mason Plumlee (13)
| CJ McCollum (4)
| Staples Center19,393
| 20–27
|- style="background:#cfc;"
| 48
| January 27
| Memphis
| 
| Damian Lillard (33)
| Mason Plumlee (10)
| Damian Lillard (6)
| Moda Center19,558
| 21–27
|- style="background:#fcc;"
| 49
| January 29
| Golden State
| 
| CJ McCollum (28)
| Mason Plumlee (11)
| Damian Lillard (8)
| Moda Center19,393
| 21–28
|- style="background:#cfc;"
| 50
| January 31
| Charlotte
| 
| Damian Lillard (27)
| Mason Plumlee (11)
| McCollum, Lillard, Leonard (4)
| Moda Center19,393
| 22–28

|- style="background:#fcc;"
| 51
| February 3
| Dallas
| 
| CJ McCollum (28)
| Plumlee, Lillard (9)
| McCollum, Lillard (6)
| Moda Center19,393
| 22–29
|- style="background:#fcc;"
| 52
| February 5
| @ Oklahoma City
| 
| Damian Lillard (29)
| CJ McCollum (8)
| Plumlee, Lillard (3)
| Chesapeake Energy Arena18,203
| 22–30
|- style="background:#cfc;"
| 53
| February 7
| @ Dallas
| 
| CJ McCollum (32)
| Mason Plumlee (13)
| Damian Lillard (6)
| American Airlines Center19,526
| 23–30
|- style="background:#fcc;"
| 54
| February 9
| Boston
| 
| Damian Lillard (28)
| Noah Vonleh (9)
| Damian Lillard (7)
| Moda Center19,393
| 23–31
|- style="background:#fcc;"
| 55
| February 13
| Atlanta
| 
| CJ McCollum (26)
| Al-Farouq Aminu (15)
| CJ McCollum (5)
| Moda Center19,475
| 23–32
|- style="background:#fcc;"
| 56
| February 15
| @ Utah
| 
| CJ McCollum (18)
| Nurkic, Connaughton, Vonleh (7)
| Damian Lillard (7)
| Vivint Smart Home Arena19,590
| 23–33
|- align="center"
|colspan="9" bgcolor="#bbcaff"|All-Star Break
|- style="background:#cfc;"
| 57
| February 23
| @ Orlando
| 
| Damian Lillard (33)
| Jusuf Nurkic (12)
| McCollum, Napier (6)
| Amway Center17,437
| 24–33
|- style="background:#fcc;"
| 58
| February 26
| @ Toronto
| 
| Damian Lillard (28)
| Al-Farouq Aminu (8)
| Damian Lillard (8)
| Air Canada Centre19,800
| 24–34
|- style="background:#fcc;"
| 59
| February 28
| @ Detroit
| 
| Damian Lillard (34)
| Damian Lillard (11)
| Damian Lillard (9)
| Palace of Auburn Hills13,502
| 24–35

|- style="background:#cfc;"
| 60
| March 2
| Oklahoma City
| 
| Damian Lillard (33)
| Jusuf Nurkic (12)
| Jusuf Nurkic (6)
| Moda Center19,875
| 25–35
|- style="background:#cfc;"
| 61
| March 4
| Brooklyn
| 
| CJ McCollum (31)
| Nurkic, Aminu (6)
| Damian Lillard (11)
| Moda Center19,638
| 26–35
|- style="background:#cfc;"
| 62
| March 7
| @ Oklahoma City
| 
| Allen Crabbe (23)
| Jusuf Nurkic (8)
| Damian Lillard (8)
| Chesapeake Energy Arena18,203
| 27–35
|- style="background:#cfc;"
| 63
| March 9
| Philadelphia
| 
| Jusuf Nurkic (28)
| Jusuf Nurkic (20)
| Jusuf Nurkic (8)
| Moda Center19,240
| 28–35
|- style="background:#fcc;"
| 64
| March 11
| Washington
| 
| CJ McCollum (34)
| Nurkic, Aminu (8)
| Damian Lillard (7)
| Moda Center19,482
| 28–36
|- style="background:#cfc;"
| 65
| March 12
| @ Phoenix
| 
| Damian Lillard (39)
| Al-Farouq Aminu (12)
| CJ McCollum (4)
| Talking Stick Resort Arena16,664
| 29–36
|- style="background:#fcc;"
| 66
| March 14
| @ New Orleans
| 
| Damian Lillard (29)
| Vonleh, Aminu (8)
| Shabazz Napier (3)
| Smoothie King Center15,530
| 29–37
|- style="background:#cfc;"
| 67
| March 15
| @ San Antonio
| 
| Damian Lillard (36)
| Jusuf Nurkic (9)
| McCollum, Lillard (4)
| AT&T Center18,418
| 30–37
|- style="background:#cfc;"
| 68
| March 18
| @ Atlanta
| 
| Damian Lillard (27)
| Noah Vonleh (11)
| Jusuf Nurkic (6)
| Philips Arena16,543
| 31–37
|- style="background:#cfc;"
| 69
| March 19
| @ Miami
| 
| Damian Lillard (49)
| Jusuf Nurkic (12)
| McCollum, Lillard (5)
| American Airlines Arena19,600
| 32–37
|- style="background:#fcc;"
| 70
| March 21
| Milwaukee
| 
| Damian Lillard (31)
| Jusuf Nurkic (14)
| Damian Lillard (7)
| Moda Center19,525
| 32–38
|- style="background:#cfc;"
| 71
| March 23
| New York
| 
| Damian Lillard (30)
| Noah Vonleh (11)
| Damian Lillard (5)
| Moda Center19,020
| 33–38
|- style="background:#cfc;"
| 72
| March 25
| Minnesota
| 
| CJ McCollum (32)
| Jusuf Nurkic (9)
| Damian Lillard (8)
| Moda Center19,580
| 34–38
|- style="background:#cfc;"
| 73
| March 26
| @ L.A. Lakers
| 
| Damian Lillard (22)
| Noah Vonleh (14)
| Damian Lillard (5)
| Staples Center18,698
| 35–38
|- style="background:#cfc;"
| 74
| March 28
| Denver
| 
| CJ McCollum (37)
| Jusuf Nurkic (16)
| Damian Lillard (7)
| Moda Center20,003
| 36–38
|- style="background:#cfc;"
| 75
| March 30
| Houston
| 
| Damian Lillard (31)
| Jusuf Nurkic (11)
| Damian Lillard (11)
| Moda Center20,049
| 37–38

|- style="background:#cfc;"
| 76
| April 1
| Phoenix
| 
| Damian Lillard (31)
| Meyers Leonard (13)
| McCollum, Lillard (7)
| Moda Center18,915
| 38–38
|- style="background:#fcc;"
| 77
| April 3
| @ Minnesota
| 
| Damian Lillard (25)
| Maurice Harkless (8)
| Damian Lillard (6)
| Target Center14,677
| 38–39
|- style="background:#fcc;"
| 78
| April 4
| @ Utah
| 
| CJ McCollum (25)
| CJ McCollum (6)
| Damian Lillard (4)
| Vivint Smart Home Arena19,911
| 38–40
|- style="background:#cfc;"
| 79
| April 6
| Minnesota
| 
| Allen Crabbe (25)
| Damian Lillard (9)
| Damian Lillard (8)
| Moda Center19,393
| 39–40
|- style="background:#cfc;"
| 80
| April 8
| Utah
| 
| Damian Lillard (59)
| Al-Farouq Aminu (12)
| McCollum, Lillard (5)
| Moda Center19,865
| 40–40
|- style="background:#cfc;"
| 81
| April 10
| San Antonio
| 
| Shabazz Napier (32)
| Noah Vonleh (11)
| Evan Turner (7)
| Moda Center19,393
| 41–40
|- style="background:#fcc;"
| 82
| April 12
| New Orleans
| 
| Shabazz Napier (25)
| Noah Vonleh (19)
| Pat Connaughton (7)
| Moda Center19,521
| 41–41

Playoffs

|- style="background:#fcc;"
| 1
| April 16
| @ Golden State
| 
| CJ McCollum (41)
| Evan Turner (10)
| Turner, Vonleh (4)
| Oracle Arena19,596
| 0–1
|- style="background:#fcc;"
| 2
| April 19
| @ Golden State
| 
| Maurice Harkless (15)
| Maurice Harkless (8)
| Evan Turner (7)
| Oracle Arena19,596
| 0–2
|- style="background:#fcc;"
| 3
| April 22
| Golden State
| 
| CJ McCollum (32)
| Jusuf Nurkic (11)
| Lillard, Nurkic (4)
| Moda Center20,177
| 0–3
|- style="background:#fcc;"
| 4
| April 24
| Golden State
| 
| Damian Lillard (34)
| Noah Vonleh (14)
| Damian Lillard (6)
| Moda Center19,902
| 0–4

Transactions

Trades

Free agency

Re-signed

Additions

Subtractions

References

Portland Trail Blazers seasons
Portland Trail Blazers
Portland Trail Blazers
Portland Trail Blazers
Portland
Portland